Robinetinidol is a flavanol, a type of flavonoids.

Prorobinetinidins, flavanols oligomers containing robinetinidol, can be found in Stryphnodendron adstringens.

See also
 Robinetinidin, the corresponding anthocyanidin

References

External links
 Robinetinidol on metabolomics.jp

Flavanols
Pyrogallols